The Buy Till You Die (BTYD) class of statistical models are designed to capture the behavioral characteristics of non-contractual customers, or when the company is not able to directly observe when a customer stops being a customer of a brand. The goal is typically to model and forecast customer lifetime value. 

BTYD models all jointly model two processes: (1) a repeat purchase process, that explains how frequently customers make purchases while they are still "alive"; and (2) a dropout process, which models how likely a customer is to churn in any given time period.

Common versions of the BTYD model include:

 The Pareto/NBD model, which models the dropout process as a  Pareto Type II distribution and the purchase frequency process as a negative binomial distribution
 The Beta-Geometric/NBD model, which models the dropout process as a geometric distribution with a  beta  mixing distribution, and models the purchase frequency process as a negative binomial distribution.

The concept was firstly introduced in 1987, in an article in Management Science, which concerns on counting and identifying those customers who are still active.

References

Consumer behaviour